Blake v. City and County of San Francisco, 113 U.S. 679 (1885),  was an appeal from a decree that dismissed a bill filed by the appellant to restrain the infringement by the appellees of reissued letters patent granted to the appellant as the assignee of original letters patent issued to Thomas H. Bailey. The original patent was dated February 9, 1864, and the reissue September 18, 1877. They were for "a new and improved valve for water cylinders of steam fire engines and other pump cylinders." The specification, which was substantially the same in both patents, stated that previous to the invention therein described, the only valve used to relieve the pressure upon fire hose to prevent them from bursting was one operated by hand. To obviate the defects of such a valve, the inventor applied at some point between the engine or pump and the hose nozzle a valve which opened automatically by the pressure in the hose or the pump cylinder, so as to discharge an additional stream and thereby relieve the pressure.

Background
The reissued patent contains two claims, the second of which only is found in the original. They were as follows:

The combination, with a pump cylinder and hose of a fire engine, of an automatic relief valve arranged relatively thereto substantially as specified.
The combination of the value C, stem d', spring E, adjustable cap D, and pin-hole d whereby the valve may be either held upon its seat with a variable yielding pressure or may be elevated therefrom or held immovably thereon, as an ordinary screw plug.
The answer of the defendants denied infringement, denied that Bailey was the original inventor of the devices described in his patent, and averred that his alleged invention had been in notorious public use many years before the application of a patent therefor by Bailey.

The appellant did not contend that the appellees infringe the first claim of the reissued patent. He based his demand for relief on the alleged infringement of the second claim only.

The proper construction of this claim was that it covered an automatic valve in combination with a contrivance consisting of a pinhole and pin, by which the valve may be raised from its seat, so as to leave the valve hole permanently open, or by which the valve may be rigidly closed upon its seat, making a closed or plug valve.

The evidence showed that Bailey was not the first to conceive the idea of a device for opening or closing rigidly an automatic valve. The same thing had been done by means of wedges and screws and other devices. He cannot therefore cover by his patent all the devices for producing this result, no matter what their form or mode of operation. The claim must be confined to the specific device described in the specification and claim—namely a pinhole and pin. If this construction of the claim be adopted, it is clear that no infringement is shown, for the appellees do not use a pinhole and pin for holding their valve open or closed, but a screw, sleeve, or cap, and therefore one of the elements of the combination, covered by the second claim of appellant's patent, is wanting in the device used by the appellees.

But if it be contended that the device covered by the second claim of the appellant's patent is infringed simply by the use of an automatic relief valve which can be converted at will into an open or closed valve, the evidence in the record is abundant.

Decision
Upon this state of facts, it was plain that the mere employment by the defendants of the old and well known automatic safety valve afforded no ground upon which to base the relief prayed for in the appellant's bill. Appellant's counsel therefore disclaimed any right to the exclusive use of an automatic safety valve, and said: "We do not claim the valve any further than in this combination with a steam fire engine."

If it be conceded, therefore, that the second claim of appellant's patent covered the use of an automatic relief valve applied to a steam fire engine and hose, the question is presented whether the appellant's patent thus construed is valid.

Justice Horace Gray speaking for the court;

The decree of the circuit court was affirmed.

See also
List of United States Supreme Court cases, volume 113

References

External links
 

United States patent case law
Legal history of San Francisco
United States Supreme Court cases
United States Supreme Court cases of the Waite Court
1885 in United States case law
1885 in California